Maltidhari College, Naubatpur is a degree college in Naubatpur, Bihar. It is a constituent unit of Patliputra University. College offers Senior secondary education and Undergraduate degree in Arts, Science and conducts some vocational courses.

History 
College was established in 1956. It got its first affiliation in 1957 from Patna University. After coming into existence of Babasaheb Bhimrao Ambedkar Bihar University, the college came under jurisdiction of it. College became a constituent unit of Patliputra University in 2018.

Degrees and courses 
College offers the following degrees and courses.

 Senior Secondary
 Intermediate of Arts
 Intermediate of Science
 Bachelor's degree
 Bachelor of Arts
 Bachelor of Science
 Vocational Course
 Bachelor of Computer Application

References

External links 

 Official website of college
 Patliputra University website

Constituent colleges of Patliputra University
Educational institutions established in 1956
Universities and colleges in Patna
1956 establishments in Bihar